The SG radar was an American naval surface-search radar developed during the Second World War. The prototype was tested at sea aboard the destroyer  in May 1941. It was the first microwave surface-search radar to be equipped with a plan position indicator. The first operational set was installed aboard the heavy cruiser  in April 1942.

Notes

Bibliography

Further reading

Naval radars
World War II radars
Military equipment introduced from 1940 to 1944
Military radars of the United States